Kukulkanins are chalcones isolated from Mexican Mimosa.

External links
 Kukulkanins A and B, new chalcones from Mimosa tenuefolia

Phenols